Ardeshir Kazemi (born September 9, 1920) is an Iranian actor, currently the oldest actor in Iranian cinema, television and theater and one of the 5 oldest living actors in the world.

References

External links 
 

1920 births
Living people
Iranian film actors
Iranian centenarians